Cláudio Heinrich (born November 20, 1972) is a Brazilian film and television actor and Brazilian jiu-jitsu instructor.

Biography 
Cláudio Heinrich was born in Rio de Janeiro. He is of Swiss descent.  In 2014, he became a Brazilian jiu-jitsu instructor.

Complete filmography

Television jobs

References

External links

 Cláudio Heinrich Official page (in Portuguese)
 

1972 births
Living people
Male actors from Rio de Janeiro (city)
Brazilian people of Swiss-German descent
Brazilian male film actors
Brazilian male telenovela actors

People awarded a black belt in Brazilian jiu-jitsu